Edward McWade (January 14, 1865 – May 17, 1943) was a writer, stage actor and an American film actor.

Biography
McWade was born in Washington, D.C., on January 14, 1865. His father was notable stage actor Robert McWade Sr. (1835-1913) and his younger brother was character actor Robert McWade Jr.

On September 4, 1897, McWade married actress Margaret May Fish. They performed in a number of stage and film productions together both before and after they were married.

McWade appeared in more than 130 films between 1919 and 1944, mostly in secondary roles. He also wrote 15 stage plays and silent films scripts between 1897 and 1914.

McWade died in Los Angeles, California.

Selected filmography

 Uncle Tom's Cabin (1914)
 Hornet's Nest (1919) - Wimms
 When a Man Loves (1919) - Takamura
 Dangerous Days (1920) - Dr. Haverford
 The Great Accident (1920) - Williams
 Stop Thief! (1920) - Mr. Carr
 The Husband Hunter (1920) - Charles Mack
 Wing Toy (1921) - Wong
 Pals of the West (1922) - Lee Wong
 The Strangers' Banquet (1922) - Harriman
 The Town Scandal (1923) - Avery Crawford
 The Monster (1925) - Luke Watson
 The Big Gamble (1931) - Justice of the Peace (uncredited)
 The Big Shot (1931) - Uncle Ira
 The Crowd Roars (1932) - Tom Beal - Counterman (uncredited)
 Two Seconds (1932) - The Prison Doctor
 Love Is a Racket (1932) - Messenger (uncredited)
 Big City Blues (1932) - Baggage Master (uncredited)
 Six Hours to Live (1932) - Ivan
 The Son-Daughter (1932) - Sin Kai's Servant (uncredited)
 Lawyer Man (1932) - Moyle (uncredited)
 The Billion Dollar Scandal (1933) - Income Tax Man (uncredited)
 Employees' Entrance (1933) - Second Fired Employee (uncredited)
 Murders in the Zoo (1933) - Dan Baker - Zoo Guard (uncredited)
 Girl Missing (1933) - Henry Gibson's Valet (uncredited)
 Song of the Eagle (1933) - Beer Drinking Businessman (uncredited)
 Adorable (1933) - Valet (uncredited)
 I Love That Man (1933) - Casket Salesman (uncredited)
 Bureau of Missing Persons (1933) - Tom - Dock Watchman (uncredited)
 Ever in My Heart (1933) - Mailman (uncredited)
 College Coach (1933) - Regent (uncredited)
 The Meanest Gal in Town (1934) - Clark - Tillie's Clerk
 I've Got Your Number (1934) - Crystal's Partner in Con Game (uncredited)
 Journal of a Crime (1934) - Rigaud
 I'll Tell the World (1934) - Trapper (uncredited)
 Dr. Monica (1934) - Janitor (uncredited)
 The Notorious Sophie Lang (1934) - Jeweler (uncredited)
 The Party's Over (1934) - Hurley (uncredited)
 One Exciting Adventure (1934) - Grouchy Man
 A Lost Lady (1934) - Simpson
 I Sell Anything (1934) - Mr. Arden - Old Man (uncredited)
 Gentlemen Are Born (1934) - Pawnbroker (uncredited)
 Murder in the Clouds (1934) - Clement Williams
 Bordertown (1935) - Dean of Law School (uncredited)
 Sweet Music (1935) - Justice of the Peace (uncredited)
 Life Begins at 40 (1935) - Doctor (uncredited)
 Mary Jane's Pa (1935) - Chuck - the Old Timer (uncredited)
 The Girl from 10th Avenue (1935) - Art Clerk
 Oil for the Lamps of China (1935) - Dan
 Stranded (1935) - Tim Powers
 Dante's Inferno (1935) - Professor of Anatomy (uncredited)
 China Seas (1935) - Minor Role (scenes deleted)
 Here's to Romance (1935) - Stage Doorman (uncredited)
 Red Salute (1935) - Baldy
 The Goose and the Gander (1935) - Justice of the Peace (uncredited)
 Shipmates Forever (1935) - Tailor (uncredited)
 Frisco Kid (1935) - Tupper
 The Calling of Dan Matthews (1935) - Lawyer Partington
 If You Could Only Cook (1935) - Justice of the Peace (uncredited)
 Tough Guy (1936) - Elderly Witness (uncredited)
 Darkest Africa (1936) - Gorn
 The Country Doctor (1936) - Newspaper Editor (uncredited)
 I Married a Doctor (1936) - Pa Dawson (uncredited)
 F-Man (1936) - Mr. Whitney
 The Ex-Mrs. Bradford (1936) - Minister in Film (uncredited)
 Forgotten Faces (1936) - Druggist
 The Big Noise (1936) - Douglas, the Gardener (uncredited)
 Satan Met a Lady (1936) - City Fathers Committee Member (uncredited)
 Alibi for Murder (1936) - Walter Emerson (uncredited)
 The Case of the Black Cat (1936) - Keene's Apartment Manager (uncredited)
 The Man I Marry (1936) - Druggist
 Reunion (1936) - Editor
 Laughing at Trouble (1936) - Harvey
 Let's Get Married (1937) - Tom
 The Road Back (1937) - Ticket Taker (uncredited)
 The Case of the Stuttering Bishop (1937) - Bishop Mallory
 Slim (1937) - Doctor (uncredited)
 She Had to Eat (1937) - Stationmaster Tucker (uncredited)
 They Won't Forget (1937) - Confederate Soldier
 The Women Men Marry (1937) - Brother Lamb
 A Girl with Ideas (1937) - Judge (uncredited)
 Love and Hisses (1937) - Ticket Seller (uncredited)
 The Patient in Room 18 (1938) - Frank Warren
 White Banners (1938) - Sloan
 Jezebel (1938) - Second Director (uncredited)
 Three Comrades (1938) - Ludwig - Pat's Majordomo (uncredited)
 Four's a Crowd (1938) - Mike (uncredited)
 Garden of the Moon (1938) - Peter McGillicuddy
 Comet Over Broadway (1938) - Harvey
 Zenobia (1939) - Minister (uncredited)
 They Asked for It (1939) - 'Pi' Kelly
 Naughty but Nice (1939) - Professor Trill (uncredited)
 Indianapolis Speedway (1939) - Tom Dugan, the Counterman
 The Magnificent Fraud (1939) - Little Old Man (uncredited)
 Quick Millions (1939) - Storekeeper
 No Place to Go (1939) - Old Soldier (uncredited)
 Bad Little Angel (1939) - Ticket Seller at Station (uncredited)
 Our Neighbors – The Carters (1939) - Pop Hagen
 Joe and Ethel Turp Call on the President (1939) - Neighbor (uncredited)
 Teddy, the Rough Rider (1940, Short) - Russell Alger, Secretary of War (uncredited)
 Hot Steel (1940) - Carlton
 Brother Orchid (1940) - Aged Brother (uncredited)
 The Return of Frank James (1940) - Colonel Jackson
 Money and the Woman (1940) - Bank Customer Explaining 'NSF' (uncredited)
 Margie (1940) - Pinwinkle
 A Dispatch from Reuters (1940) - Chemist Who Poisoned Medicine (uncredited)
 Youth Will Be Served (1940) - Eli Hoy (uncredited)
 Chad Hanna (1940) - Elias
 Meet John Doe (1941) - Joe (uncredited)
 The Big Store (1941) - Mr. Andrews (uncredited)
 Blossoms in the Dust (1941) - Darrow (uncredited)
 Richest Man in Town (1941) - Old Timer (uncredited)
 You'll Never Get Rich (1941) - Doctor at Induction Center (uncredited)
 Nothing but the Truth (1941) - Elderly Clerk (uncredited)
 I Wake Up Screaming (1941) - Old Man at Library (uncredited)
 Bedtime Story (1941) - Elderly Man (uncredited)
 Mr. and Mrs. North (1942) - Lacey - Antique Dealer (uncredited)
 Woman of the Year (1942) - Adolph (uncredited)
 The Lady Is Willing (1942) - Boston Doorman (uncredited)
 Yankee Doodle Dandy (1942) - New York Stage Doorman (uncredited)
 Are Husbands Necessary? (1942) - Mr. Greenfield (uncredited)
 Lady in a Jam (1942) - Ground-Hog
 Daring Young Man (1942) - Old Man (uncredited)
 You Can't Escape Forever (1942) - Jimmy (uncredited)
 The Hard Way (1943) - Stage Doorman (uncredited)
 Crash Dive (1943) - Crony (uncredited)
 Lost Angel (1943) - Old Man in the Park (uncredited)
 Arsenic and Old Lace (1944) - Mr. Gibbs - the old man

References

External links

1865 births
1943 deaths
American male film actors
American male silent film actors
American male screenwriters
Burials at Rosehill Cemetery
20th-century American male actors
20th-century American male writers
20th-century American screenwriters